Anne-Marie Marchand (27 May 1927 – 1 August 2005) was a French costume designer, daughter of the author Vladimir Pozner. She was nominated for the Academy Award for Best Costume Design for her work in the film The Return of Martin Guerre (1982).
She was buried at the Père Lachaise cemetery in the grave of François Étienne Lasné.

External links 

French costume designers
Women costume designers
1927 births
2005 deaths
Place of birth missing
Place of death missing
Burials at Père Lachaise Cemetery